Tennis at the 2001 Southeast Asian Games was held in Jalan Duta Tennis Complex, Kuala Lumpur, Malaysia from 9 to 16 September 2001  Tennis had team, doubles, and singles events for men and women, as well as a mixed doubles competition.

Medalists

Results

Men's team

1st Round

Quarter-final

Semi-final

Final

Women's team

Quarter-final

Semi-final

Final

Men's singles

Final

Top half

Bottom half

Women's singles

Men's doubles

Women's doubles

Mixed doubles

Medal table
Legend

References

Page 12
Page 21
Page 20

External links
 

2001
2001 Southeast Asian Games events